Sha Li (born 14 August 1988) is a Chinese triple jumper.

Achievements

Personal bests
Long jump - 6.31 m (2007)
Triple jump - 14.01 m (2006)

References
 

1988 births
Living people
Chinese female triple jumpers